Vibo Valentia (Monteleone before 1861; Monteleone di Calabria from 1861 to 1928;  or ) is a city and comune (municipality) in the Calabria region of southern Italy, near the Tyrrhenian Sea. It is the capital of the province of Vibo Valentia, and is an agricultural, commercial and tourist center (the most famous places nearby are Tropea, Ricadi and Pizzo). There are also several large manufacturing industries, including the tuna district of Maierato. Very important for the local economy is Vibo Marina's harbour.

History 
Vibo Valentia was originally the Greek colony of Hipponion. It was founded, probably around the late 7th century BC, by inhabitants of Locri, a principal city of the Italian Magna Graecia, south of Vibo Valentia on the Ionian Sea. Diodorus Siculus reports that the city was taken in 388 BC by Dionysius the Elder tyrant of Syracuse, who deported all the population. The population came back in 378 BC, with the help of the Carthaginians. In the following years Hipponion came under the dominion of the Bruttii, who controlled most of Calabria. After the town fell to Rome, the name was Latinized to Hipponium. The town became a Roman colony in 194 BC with the name of Vibo Valentia. After a phase of prosperity during the late Republic and early Empire, the town was almost completely abandoned after the fall of the Western Roman Empire.

In 1070 the Normans built a castle at the site of the old Acropolis and in 1235 a new city was established by Frederick II, Holy Roman emperor and king of Sicily, with the name of Monteleone. The city got back the old Roman name of Vibo Valentia only in 1928.

Government

Bishopric
A Diocese of Vibo Valentia was established in 451AD and suppressed in 1083AD when it was incorporated into the Diocese of Mileto.
In 1968 it was restored as a titular see. The title has been assigned to:
 Andreas Rigracher (1969–1970)
 Luciano Angeloni (1970–1996) 
 Aldo Cavalli (1996–present)

Main sights 
 Norman-Hohenstaufen Castle, located most likely on the site of Hipponion acropolis, and built around 1000. For its construction materials from the Greek temples nearby were used. It was damaged by an earthquake in 1783. Today the castle is home to a state museum.
 Church of Santa Maria Maggiore e San Leoluca (Cathedral), built in the 9th century over the remains of a Byzantine basilica. It has an 18th-century marble high altar with a 16th-century sculpture of "Madonna della Neve", and a Renaissance triptych.
 Santa Ruba:  (c. 1000), church built during the reign of Pope Callixtus II. It has a large cupola in Oriental style. It is located halfway between Vibo Valentia and San Gregorio d'Ippona.
 Church of the Rosario (c. 1337), located over a Roman temple. Originally in Gothic style, it was remade after the 1783 earthquake. Moreover, it preserves different paintings of the local artist Giulio Rubino as well as 5 polychrome wooden statues of the Sorrowful Mysteries and a Risen Christ made by Ludovico and Domenico Rubino (brothers of Giulio, the painter), carried in procession during the Holy Week. 
 Church of Carmine: built in the 17th century with a single-nave and an oval shape. The convent has been the city hospital for a long time. 
 Church of Santa Maria degli Angeli: built between 1621 and 1666, at first annexed to the convent of the Reformed Friars Minor (now National Boarding School), it is handled by Capuchin Fathers. It preserves a wooden Cross called "of Angels" of an unknown author of '600, destination of thousands of devotees who go on pilgrimage every year by tradition on every Friday in March. 
 Church of Saint Michael: inside there are a paint by Luca Giordano, San Michele che scaccia Lucifero, and a paint by Ludovico Mazzanti, Estasi di Sant'Ignazio.
 Church of Saint Joseph: wanted by the Jesuit Fathers, it was opened to worship in 1701 with the name of Saint Ignatius or of Jesus; it preserves several paintings including The vision of Saint Ignatius and sculptures like the wooden composition of Saint Joseph on the high altar.
 Church of the Holy Spirit: built in 1579, it is still deconsecrated; it was the first church of the city before the construction of the current one. Inside different artistic works were preserved until its closing and then they were moved to other churches in the city. 
 Church of Santa Maria la Nova: built in 1521 with the name of Santa Maria di Gesù by duke Ettore Pignatelli, it preserves the sarcophagus of him. During the Napoleonic domination it was used as stable and armory; then, in 1837, it was restored and reopened by Enrico Gagliardi. Inside there are many works by the Flemish painter Dirk Hendricksz.
 Church of Santa Maria del Soccorso: built around 1632, it was reconstructed in 1791 based on the drawings provided by Bernardo Morena.
 La Madonnella: small church built on the site of the ancient convent of the Capuchins.
 Church of Saint Anthony of Padua: built during the 17th century, it was annexed to the convent of Friars Minor Capuchin; on the inside there are one painting by Luca Giordano, La Madonna col bambino tra i Santi Anna e Felice, and one by Pacecco De Rosa, l'Immaculata con i santi Francesco e Antonio.

Twin towns 
  Corleone, Palermo, Sicily, Italy
 Ruda Śląska, Poland
 Vrnjačka Banja, Serbia
 Ituzaingó, Argentina

References 

 The Columbia Encyclopedia, Sixth Edition. Columbia University Press. 2001. 
 The Princeton encyclopedia of classical sites; Stillwell, Richard. MacDonald, William L. McAlister, Marian Holland. Princeton, N.J. Princeton University Press. 1976.

External links 
 

 
Cities and towns in Calabria
Populated places established in the 7th century BC
Populated coastal places in Italy